Vijayanagar Assembly constituency is one of the 224 constituencies in the Karnataka Legislative Assembly of Karnataka a south state of India. It is also part of Bangalore South Lok Sabha constituency.

Member of Legislative Assembly
 2008: M. Krishnappa, Indian National Congress
 2013: M. Krishnappa, Indian National Congress
 2018: M. Krishnappa, Indian National Congress

Election results

2018

See also
 Bangalore Urban district
 List of constituencies of Karnataka Legislative Assembly

References

Assembly constituencies of Karnataka
Bangalore Urban district